The Man Who Fell to Earth is a 1976 film starring David Bowie and directed by Nicolas Roeg.

The Man Who Fell to Earth may also refer to:

 The Man Who Fell to Earth (novel), the 1963 science fiction novel by Walter Tevis
 The Man Who Fell to Earth (1987 film), the television film adaptation of the novel
 The Man Who Fell to Earth (TV series), the Showtime series, a sequel to the 1976 film

See also
 "The Woman Who Fell to Earth", a 2018 episode of Doctor Who